The 1984 USA Outdoor Track and Field Championships took place between June 8–9 at Jaguar Stadium on the campus of San Jose City College in San Jose, California. The meet was organized by The Athletics Congress.

This meet was separate from the 1984 Olympic Trials, held in the Los Angeles Memorial Coliseum a week later.  Among the notable events at this meet were Leslie Maxie's youth world best in the 400 metres hurdles that lasted more than 30 years.  Also, then 47 year old Al Oerter was at this meet making one last attempt to get to the Olympics, 16 years after the end of his 4 successive gold medal streak in the discus.  His hopes ended here when he was injured stepping into a crater left by a hammer during the preliminary round.  Local rivals John Powell and Mac Wilkins instead threw their season bests at this meet before going on to the silver (Wilkins) and bronze (Powell) medals at the Olympics in Los Angeles.

Results

Men track events

Men field events

Women track events

Women field events

See also
United States Olympic Trials (track and field)

References

External links
 results

USA Outdoor Track and Field Championships
Usa Outdoor Track And Field Championships, 1984
Track and field
Track and field in California
Outdoor Track and Field Championships
Outdoor Track and Field Championships
Sports competitions in California